Sang-e Hasadi (also Romanized as Sang-e Ḩasādī) is a village in Nargesan Rural District, Jebalbarez-e Jonubi District, Anbarabad County, Kerman Province, Iran. At the 2006 census, its population was 22, in 5 families.

References 

Populated places in Anbarabad County